Yuzhen Tsentralen Planning Region (South-Central Planning Region) is a Bulgarian planning region. The capital is Plovdiv, the second-largest city in Bulgaria. It includes five Bulgarians provinces: Plovdiv Province, Pazardzhik Province, Smolyan Province, Kardzhali Province and Haskovo Province.

It is the second most important economical region of the country which together with the Yugozapaden region produce almost two thirds of the national GDP.

See also 
 NUTS of Bulgaria

References

Regions of Bulgaria